John S. Brown (born  1810) was a Michigan politician.

Early life
Brown as born around 1810 in Livingston County, New York. In 1838, Brown moved to Michigan.

Career
Brown was a farmer. On November 7, 1842, Brown was elected to the Michigan House of Representatives where he represented the Hillsdale County district from January 2, 1843 to March 9, 1843. Brown was a Democrat.

Removal from Michigan
In 1845, Brown moved away from Michigan to the American West.

References

Year of death unknown
Farmers from Michigan
People from Hillsdale County, Michigan
People from Livingston County, New York
Democratic Party members of the Michigan House of Representatives
19th-century American politicians
Year of birth uncertain